St. Thomas Episcopal Church is an historic Episcopal church located at 5 Hale Street in Dover, New Hampshire, in the United States.  Founded in 1839, its building, designed by English architect Henry Vaughan, is an important example of his work, and was listed on the National Register of Historic Places in 1984.

History
St. Thomas Episcopal Church was organized on September 22, 1839, and in 1840 built a Carpenter Gothic church on the corner of Central Avenue and St. Thomas Street next to the William Hale House. In the late 1880s, the city of Dover took the land of both the church and the Hale House by eminent domain to build a new City Hall. The church was demolished in 1891 and the Hale House was moved to the other side of Hale Street.

The church bought a lot next to the relocated Hale House and, in 1890, hired architect Henry Vaughan to design a new church in the Gothic Revival, or English Perpendicular, style. Construction began in 1891 and the first service was held the next year. The church was not consecrated though until September 17, 1916. In 1901, the church bought the William Hale House, which was also later listed on the National Register of Historic Places.  On June 7, 1984, it was added to the National Register of Historic Places.

St. Thomas Episcopal Church is still an active parish in the Seacoast Deanery of the Episcopal Diocese of New Hampshire. The Rev. Suzanne Poulin was called to be the rector on January 25, 2018 and accepted the call.

Architecture
St. Thomas is located in downtown Dover, on the south side of Hale Street, across from Dover City Hall.  It is basically rectangular in footprint, with a square tower rising at the northwest corner, and slightly projecting transepts.  The tower has an outside circular turret which houses its spiral staircase.  The tower has angled buttresses at the corners, and the main church body's side windows are also articulated by buttressing.  It is covered by a gabled roof supported by heavy wooden trusses in a kingpost form.  The interior retains original woodwork and plaster; its gas chandeliers have been replaced by electric lighting.  At the back (south side), it is joined by a modern parish hall to the William Hale House, which stands just to its east.

See also

 National Register of Historic Places listings in Strafford County, New Hampshire
 St. Thomas Episcopal Church (disambiguation)

References

External links
 St. Thomas Episcopal Church website
 St. Thomas Episcopal Church history
 Dover Library history of church

Churches on the National Register of Historic Places in New Hampshire
Episcopal church buildings in New Hampshire
Buildings and structures in Dover, New Hampshire
Churches in Strafford County, New Hampshire
National Register of Historic Places in Strafford County, New Hampshire